In functional analysis, the class of B-convex spaces is a class of Banach space.  The concept of B-convexity was defined and used to characterize Banach spaces that have the strong law of large numbers by Anatole Beck in 1962;  accordingly, "B-convexity" is understood as an abbreviation of Beck convexity.  Beck proved the following theorem: A Banach space is B-convex if and only if every sequence of independent, symmetric, uniformly bounded and Radon random variables in that space satisfies the strong law of large numbers.

Let X be a Banach space with norm || ||.  X is said to be B''-convex if for some ε > 0 and some natural number n, it holds true that whenever x1, ..., xn are elements of the closed unit ball of X, there is a choice of signs α1, ..., α''n ∈ {−1, +1} such that

Later authors have shown that B-convexity is equivalent to a number of other important properties in the theory of Banach spaces.  Being B-convex and having Rademacher type  were shown to be equivalent Banach-space properties by Gilles Pisier.

References

 
  (See chapter 9)

Banach spaces
Convex geometry